Oscar Mina (born 24 September 1958) is a Sanmarinese politician, who served as Captain Regent of San Marino with Paolo Rondelli from 1 April to 1 October 2022. He previously served as Captain Regent from 1 April 2009 to October 2009 together with Massimo Cenci.

Mina was elected to the Grand and General Council as a member of the Sammarinese Christian Democratic Party in 2006.

Life
In 1979, Oscar Mina graduated in electrical engineering and subsequently studied political science at the University of Urbino. Since 1979, he is a civil servant in San Marino's water and gas supply. Mina is single and lives in Serravalle.

Politics
Mina joined the Christian Democratic PDCS in 1998. He was elected in 2006, 2008 and 2012 in the Grand and General Council, the parliament of San Marino. From 2006 to 2007, he was a member of the Finance Committee and the Interparliamentary Commission. Since 2007, he is a member of the Judiciary Committee. He has been a member of the OSCE Parliamentary Assembly since 2008, and has headed the San Maritime Delegation since 2009. Mina is a Deputy Chairman of the PDCS since 2008. For the period from 1 April 2009 to 1 October 2009, Oscar Mina was elected in the Captains Regent, head of San Marino, along with Massimo Cenci . On the 28 April 2011, he was the successor of the resigned Christian Democratic Party in San Marino. After the 2012 election, he was confirmed in this office. In the 28th legislative term from December 2012, Mina is the chair of the Health Committee and the San Marines delegation to the OSCE Parliamentary Assembly.

References

External links

1958 births
Living people
University of Urbino alumni
Captains Regent of San Marino
Members of the Grand and General Council
Sammarinese Christian Democratic Party politicians
People from Serravalle (San Marino)